The Yale Initiative for the Interdisciplinary Study of Antisemitism (YIISA) was an academic center at Yale University in New Haven, Connecticut.  Founded in 2005, it was the first university-based center in North America dedicated to the study of antisemitism. Professor Charles A. Small was the director. In early June 2011, Yale announced the closure of the Initiative by the end of July, sparking protest from the organized American Jewish community. After its closure, Yale announced the opening of the Yale Program for the Study of Antisemitism under the direction of Professor Maurice Samuels.

History
Professor Charles Small founded the Institute for the Study of Global Anti-Semitism and Policy (ISGAP) in 2005 in New Haven, as an independent research organization to study global antisemitism and other forms of racism. In 2006, the center became part of Yale University as the Yale Initiative for Interdisciplinary Study of Antisemitism (YIISA). It is part of the university's Yale's Institution for Social and Policy Studies. Small explained his motivations to a reporter this way, "The world is changing rapidly and I think Anti-Semitism is changing rapidly... As scholars it is our responsibility and job to begin to analyze and understand these processes."

At the time, it was the fourth university center for antisemitism to be established, following centers at the Technical University of Berlin, and Hebrew University and Tel Aviv University in Israel.

Closure
In early June 2011, Yale University notified YIISA that the center would be closed at the end of July. A Yale spokesman stated that the initiative did not meet "its academic expectations and has been canceled."

Yale's decision sparked widespread criticism from the American Jewish community. David Harris, Executive Director of the American Jewish Committee, said the Initiative's termination would "create a very regrettable void." National Director of the Anti-Defamation League, Abraham Foxman, stated, "Especially at a time when anti-Semitism continues to be virulent and anti-Israel parties treat any effort to address issues relating to anti-Zionism and anti-Semitism as illegitimate, Yale’s decision is particularly unfortunate and dismaying." Walter Reich, a member of the board of advisers of YIISA and a former director of the U.S. Holocaust Memorial Museum wrote that the closure came on the tails of a "firestorm" which ensued after YIISA hosted a conference in August 2010 entitled "Global Antisemitism: A Crisis of Modernity", where some of the speakers highlighted instances of antisemitism in the Arab-Muslim world.

Antony Lerman, a British scholar of antisemitism, welcomed Yale's decision to close YIISA. Lerman argued that the organization was politicized and that its demise should be welcomed by those who "genuinely support the principle of the objective, dispassionate study of contemporary antisemitism." Robert Wistrich, the director of the Vidal Sassoon International Center for the Study of Antisemitism at Hebrew University agreed with the decision to close the center, saying that there was "no way that Yale could have come to a different decision" given the program's perceived lack of academic rigor.

Successor program
On June 20, 2011, less than three weeks after Yale said YIISA would be closed, Yale's provost Peter Salovey announced the creation of a new program for the study of antisemitism named the Yale Program for the Study of Antisemitism (YPSA). In the wake of the YIISA decision, Salovey said a group of faculty members expressed interest in creating a new initiative. Professor Maurice Samuels, director of the new institute, said research would be devoted to both contemporary and historical antisemitism, stating, "Like many, I am concerned by the recent upsurge in violence against Jews around the world."

Charles Small, the former executive director of YIISA expressed skepticism regarding the new program, accusing it of being too historically focused: "Anti-Semitism is a 21st-century relevant issue. To focus on its roots and history, glosses over issues scholars must address today, especially when it comes to the threat of contemporary radical Islamist anti-Semitism."

References

External links
 Yale Initiative for the Interdisciplinary Study of Antisemitism

Yale University
Centers for the study of antisemitism
Research institutes established in 2005
2005 establishments in Connecticut